The Contemporary Pacific: A Journal of Island Affairs is an academic journal covering a wide range of disciplines with the aim of providing comprehensive coverage of contemporary developments in the entire Pacific Islands region, including Melanesia, Micronesia, and Polynesia. It features refereed, readable articles that examine social, economic, political, ecological, and cultural topics, along with political reviews, book and media reviews, resource reviews, and a dialogue section with interviews and short essays. Each recent issue highlights the work of a Pacific Islander artist.

The journal was founded at the University of Hawaii Center for Pacific Islands Studies under the directorship of Robert C. Kiste, with then-CPIS faculty member Brij Lal serving as editor of volumes 1-4. The historian David Hanlon edited volumes 5-10, the anthropologist Geoffrey M. White edited volumes 11-13, the playwright Vilsoni Hereniko edited volumes 14-20, and the political scientist Terence Wesley-Smith edits current volumes. The journal continues to be edited at the UH Center for Pacific Islands Studies and published by the University of Hawaii Press. CPIS also edits and UH Press publishes the related Pacific Islands Monograph Series.

From volume 15 (2003), the journal began featuring the work of a different Pacific Islander artist on the cover and inside each issue. Among the artists featured so far are John Pule of Niue, Kapulani Landgraf of Hawaii, Rongotai Lomas of New Zealand, Ake Lianga of the Solomon Islands, Meleanna Aluli Meyer of Hawaii, Ric R Castro of Guam, Albert Wendt of Samoa, Larry Santana of Papua New Guinea, Shigeyuki Kihara of New Zealand, Ralph Regenvanu of Vanuatu, Carl Franklin Kaailāau Pao of Hawaii, Jewel Castro of Samoa, Lingikoni Vaka‘uta of Tonga, Daniel Waswas of Papua New Guinea, Sue Pearson of Norfolk Island, Michael Tuffery of New Zealand, Niki Hastings-McFall of New Zealand, Solomon Enos of Hawaii, Andy Leileisi'uao of Samoa, Ani O'Neill of New Zealand, and the Jaki-Ed Collective in the Marshall Islands.

The Contemporary Pacific appears semiannually. Its first electronic edition appeared in 2000 on Project MUSE. Back issues are being added to an open-access archive in the University of Hawaii at Mānoa's ScholarSpace institutional repository.

External links
 Sponsor homepage
 Publisher homepage
 MUSE homepage
 Institutional repository
 Pacific Islands Monograph Series
 ScholarSpace

Cultural journals
Oceania studies journals
English-language journals
Publications established in 1989